State Route 130 (SR 130) is a state highway that connects U.S. Route 101 in San Jose, California with the Lick Observatory on Mount Hamilton. The segment in San Jose runs along Alum Rock Avenue, while the remainder of SR 130 follows Mount Hamilton Road, a narrow two-lane highway that goes through the Diablo Range in Santa Clara County. Legislatively, SR 130 extends east from Mount Hamilton to Patterson in Stanislaus County, forming a route between the Santa Clara and San Joaquin valleys, but the traversable route via San Antonio Valley Road and Del Puerto Canyon Road is maintained at the county level and has not yet been formally adopted by the California Department of Transportation (Caltrans).

Route description

SR 130 begins in the west at U.S. Route 101 just east of Downtown San Jose and runs along the 4-6 lane Alum Rock Avenue. It continues over a junction with Interstate 680 through San Jose's Alum Rock neighborhood. The road narrows as it begins to run into the foothills from four to six lanes down to two. Where Alum Rock Avenue and Mount Hamilton Road meet, SR 130 heads east up into the mountains along Mount Hamilton Road, offering vistas of San Jose and the Santa Clara Valley, and traveling through some of the last remaining ranch and naturally wild land in Santa Clara County as well as Joseph D. Grant County Park. As SR 130 approaches the base of Mount Hamilton itself, the road narrows further and is barely capable of supporting two cars abreast. The narrow road begins a series of tight switchbacks that culminate on the summit of Mount Hamilton at the Lick Observatory. The observatory also serves as the existing route's eastern terminus at around 4,200 ft. (1,280 m) elevation. When snow falls on the higher elevations of the road, it is closed until crews can clear the snow and black ice. There is a small community in this area.

Although state maintenance of SR 130 ends at this point, the road continues east of the Lick Observatory as the county road San Antonio Valley Road. San Antonio Valley Road terminates at the intersection of Mines Road (to Livermore) and Del Puerto Canyon Road, which the latter eventually leads to Interstate 5 and Patterson. It consists of one to two lanes, and may be considered a part of SR 130 by the state in the future. The County of Santa Clara has posted SR 130 markers along the section it controls, but the route within Stanislaus County remains totally unsigned by either the state or the county there.

To the west, after the continuation of SR 130, Alum Rock Road continues as Santa Clara Street, after which it becomes SR 82, continuing north to San Francisco. There are currently no plans to designate Santa Clara Street between US 101 and SR 82 as SR 130.

A portion of SR 130 in San Jose is part of the National Highway System, a network of highways that are considered essential to the country's economy, defense, and mobility by the Federal Highway Administration.

History
SR 130 did not exist as a state highway before 1964; however, the roads it travels had existed since Lick Observatory was built. Legislatively, SR 130 continues for 30 additional miles (48 km) east of Lick Observatory to State Route 33 in Patterson, California through the San Antonio Valley. East of the Lick Observatory, the road is maintained by the county rather than the state, and therefore this portion of the state highway remains technically unbuilt.

However, the County of Santa Clara has posted small SR 130 markers along the traversable route, including where San Antonio Canyon Road begins east of the Lick Observatory entrance, the intersection of San Antonio and Del Puerto Canyon Roads. and at the Stanislaus County line. Thus, map makers may acknowledge SR 130 existing east of the summit.

Future
Money had been set aside by the state to study the feasibility of turning part of SR 130's legislative route from San Antonio Valley Road east to Interstate 5 into a freeway. This was intended to facilitate traffic between the Santa Clara Valley and the Central Valley; the former is experiencing population growth and real estate development. The project's main proponent was former United States Representative Richard Pombo, who was the House Resources Committee chair when in Congress and himself a member of a family with extensive Central Valley property holdings near the proposed freeway's path.

The proposed freeway's path west of San Antonio Valley Road would have bypassed Mount Hamilton either to the north toward State Route 237 or to the south toward San Jose's Evergreen district. The feasibility of the project came into question, however, as constructing a freeway over the Diablo Range near three of its highest peaks (Mount Hamilton included) would have been very difficult. The project also faced stiff opposition from taxpayers, environmentalists, residents of the area looking to preserve their area's local charm, and the Lick Observatory (A freeway through the mountains near the observatory would render it useless by light pollution). The freeway plan was quietly abandoned after Congressman Pombo failed in his reelection bid in 2006.

Major intersections

Mount Hamilton to Patterson
This junction list consists of the county-maintained, Mount Hamilton-to-Patterson route that has not yet been formally adopted by Caltrans. There are no postmiles maintained by the state.

See also

References

External links

Eric Buchanan's Highway 130 Photos Index page
California @ AARoads.com - State Route 130
Caltrans: Route 130 highway conditions
California Highways: SR 130

130
State Route 130
Diablo Range
State Route 130